The 35th Separate Guards Motor Rifle Brigade (Military Unit Number 41659) is a unit of the Russian Ground Forces. It traces its history back to the formation of the Soviet 4th Tank Corps during the Second World War. It forms part of the 41st Combined Arms Army (CAA), and has its headquarters in a former Strategic Rocket Forces installation at Aleysk in Siberia.

History 
In accordance with State Committee of Defence (NKO) Order No. 724218сс оf 31 March 1942, the 4th Tank Corps was established in the Voronezh area in April 1942. By order of the NKO of the USSR No. 57 dated February 7, 1943, in recognition of the courage and heroism of its personnel, the 4th Tank Corps was awarded the "Guards" honorary title, and transformed into the 5th Guards Tank Corps.

In the final stages of the Battle of Stalingrad, the 4th Tank Corps was awarded the honorary title "Stalingrad" by NKO Order No. 42 of 27 January 1943. 

The corps participated in the following operations:
 the Kursk strategic defensive operation (Battle of Kursk, from 5 July 1943 - 23 July 1943.
 Belogorod-Kharkov offensive operation (Operation Rumyantsev) 3 August 1943 - 23 August 1943. On 6 November 1943 the 5th Guards Tank Corps was awarded the honorary title "Kiev" by a Prikaz of the Supreme Commander-in-Chief.
 Chernigov-Poltava Offensive [08/26/1943 - 09/30/1944]
 Sumy-Priluki Operation [08/26/1943 - 09/30/1943]
 Kyiv Strategic Offensive Operation (Battle of Kiev (1943))
 Kyiv defensive operation, (1943), 13 November - 22 December 1943
 Dnieper–Carpathian offensive (Seizure of Right-Bank Ukraine), 12 December 1943 - 17 April 1944.
 Zhytomyr-Berdichev operation [12/24/1943 - 01/14/1944]
 Korsun-Shevchenko operation [01/24/1944 - 02/17/1944]
 Umansko-Botoshanskaya operation
 Second Jassy–Kishinev offensive, 20 August 1944 - 29 August 1944.
 Debrecen Offensive (Battle of Debrecen), 6 October 1944 - 28 October 1944.
 Budapest Offensive
 Vienna Offensive [03/16/1945 - 04/15/1945]
 Bratislava–Brno offensive (at its final stage)
 Prague Offensive [05/06/1945 - 05/11/1945]
 Soviet invasion of Manchuria [08/09/1945 - 09/02/1945]
 Khingan-Mukden offensive operation [08/09/1945 - 09/02/1945]

On 14 September 1945, on the basis of the order of the NKO of the USSR No. 0013 dated June 10, 1945, the corps, within the overall  demobilization process, was reorganised as the 5th "Stalingradsko-Kievskaya Order of Lenin Red Banner orders of Suvorov and Kutuzov" Guards Tank Division (First Formation). Immediately after the war the division was part od the 6th Guards Tank Army. From September 1945 to June 1957 the division formed part of the 6th Guards Tank Army (briefly 6th Guards Mechanised Army).

On 29 June 1957 the 5th Guards Tank Division became the 122nd Guards Motor Rifle Division. From 1976 to 1989 it formed part of the 36th Army. It became a Machine-Gun Artillery Division in 1989, a Motor Rifle Division in 2001, and then the 35th Separate Guards Motor Rifle Brigade in June 2009.

After the brigade began to take part in the 2022 Russian invasion of Ukraine, messages from relatives revealed that the brigade had suffered heavy losses.

Commanders 
 Guards Major General Grigoriy Rostislavovich Tyurin
 Guards Colonel Andrey O. Shelukhin
 Guards Colonel Oleg Vladmirovich Kurygin

Notes

Further reading 
 
 Приказ Верховного Главнокомандующего № 37, от 6 ноября 1943 года, «Об овладении столицей Советской Украины городом Киев».
 Завизион, Гавриил Тимофеевич, Корнюшин П. А. И на Тихом океане… — Moscow: Voenizdat, 1967.
 Краснознамённый Киевский. Очерки истории Краснознамённого Киевского военного округа (1919—1979) [Red Kiev: Studies in the History of the Red Banner Kiev Military District (1919-1979)] Second edition, revised and expanded. Kiev, издательство политической литературы Украины [Ukraine Political Literature Publishing House] 1979. Pages 249—253.
 Герои Советского Союза. Краткий биографический словарь в двух томах — Moscow: Voenizdat, 1987.

Mechanised infantry brigades of Russia
Military units and formations established in 2009